L’eau à la bouche  is a 1960 French film directed by Jacques Doniol-Valcroze and starring Françoise Brion, Bernadette Lafont and Alexandra Stewart.

Plot

Miléna (Brion) is living in her grandmother's château when the rich lady dies. Her lawyer Miguel (Barray) insists that the woman's two other grandchildren, Fifine (Stewart) and her brother Jean-Paul (Guers), be at the château for the reading of the will, even though they've been estranged from the family since an early age. When Fifine eventually arrives at the château, it isn't long before she falls for Miguel. 

In the meantime, Fifine's boyfriend Robert (Riberolles) shows up in the guise of her brother Jean-Paul, and finds himself very attracted to his girlfriend's cousin Miléna. So, while Fifine goes after the lawyer, Robert is occupied with his own pursuits. The maid in the château, Prudence (Lafont), in turn, is undecided about whether to accept the lecherous overtures of the butler César (Galabru), who has just hired her.

Cast
 Françoise Brion – Miléna Brett-Juval
 Bernadette Lafont – Prudence
 Alexandra Stewart – Séraphine Brett-Juval, aka Fifine
 Michel Galabru – César
 Jacques Riberolles – Robert Godard
 Gérard Barray – Miguel Baran
 Paul Guers – Jean-Paul Brett-Juval
 Florence Loinod – Florence

Censorship
When L’eau à la bouche was first released in Italy in 1959, the Committee for the Theatrical Review of the Italian Ministry of Cultural Heritage and Activities rated the film suitable for people 16 years and older. In order for the film to be screened publicly, the committee recommended that the scene in which the maid and waiter are chasing each other should be cut at the moment when the maid's skirt is ripped. The Committee also requested the removal of the scene in which Milena is undressing in her room. The reason for the age restriction, cited in the official documents, is because the subject of the movie is considered to be inappropriate to the sensitivity of a minor. The official document number is 32778, signed on 2 September 1960 by Minister Renzo Helfer.

References
 Database of the documents produced by the Committee for the Theatrical Review of The Italian Ministry of Cultural Heritage and Activities, from 1944 to 2000.

External links
 

French romantic comedy films
Films directed by Jacques Doniol-Valcroze
Films scored by Serge Gainsbourg
1960 films
1960s French-language films
1950s French films